The 2013 mid-year women's rugby union tests were a series of women's rugby union matches played through June and July around the world.

United States looked to avenge two losses suffered to France during last year's European tour in Orléans and Paris.

As a part of a three-year test series agreement between New Zealand Rugby Union and Rugby Football Union, New Zealand will play against England its first match at home since 2007, when the team challenged Australia. The first test will be the curtain-raiser to the Blues – Chiefs Investec Super Rugby match and will be broadcast live on Sky in New Zealand.

For England and United States, the matches were warm-ups ahead of the 2013 Nations Cup in Denver, Colorado.

United States vs France (1st match)

Assistant referees:
n/a
n/a
Assessor:
n/a

United States vs France (2nd match)

Assistant referees:
n/a
n/a
Assessor:
n/a

United States vs France (3rd match)

Assistant referees:
n/a
n/a
Assessor:
n/a

New Zealand vs England (1st match)

Assistant referees:
Clare Daniels (England)
Jessica Beard (New Zealand)
Assessor:
n/a

New Zealand vs England (2nd match)

Assistant referees:
Nicky Inwood (New Zealand)
Lee Jeffrey (New Zealand)
Assessor:
n/a

New Zealand vs England (3rd match)

Assistant referees:
Clare Daniels (England)
Chelsea Gurr (New Zealand)
Assessor:
n/a

See also

 Women's international rugby union
 2012 end-of-year women's rugby union tests

Notes

End of year tests
Mid-year rugby union internationals